The Mazda Chantez EV was a concept car designed by Mazda as part of the A.I.S.T. government funded scheme, it was first unveiled at the 1972 Tokyo Motor Show.

Specifications

Design
The Chantez EV features a unique grill-less appearance which helps with aerodynamic efficiency, also to aid with efficiency is Mazda's first car with regenerative braking.

Powertrain

Battery

See also
 Mazda
 Mazda Chantez

References

Electric concept cars
Chantez